Irish Mexicans ( or) are inhabitants of Mexico that are immigrants from or descendants of immigrants from Ireland. The majority of Irish immigrants to Mexico were Catholic.

History

A few Mexican Irish communities existed in Mexican Texas prior to the Texas Revolution. They were fully integrated into Mexican society at the time and were linked to their host society through inter-marriage, a shared language, and business ties. When revolution broke out, many Irish sided with Catholic Mexico against Protestant pro-U.S. elements. The Batallón de San Patricio was a largely (ethnically) Irish battalion of U.S. troops who deserted and fought alongside the Mexican Army against the United States in the Mexican–American War of 1846 to 1848. Veterans of the battalion were awarded with the Cross of Honor for their service to the Mexican government. In some cases, Irish immigrants or Americans left from California (the Irish Confederate army of Fort Yuma, Arizona during the American Civil War in 1861) and blended into Mexican society instead.

Álvaro Obregón (O'Brien) was president of Mexico during 1920–1924 and Ciudad Obregón and its airport are named in his honor. Actor Anthony Quinn is another famous Mexican of Irish descent. There are also monuments in Mexico City paying tribute to those Irish who fought for Mexico in the 1800s.

Notable Irish Mexicans

 Anthony Quinn, actor
 Saul Alvarez, Mexican boxer who is a four-division world champion
 William Lamport, the real-life Zorro
 Álvaro Obregón, president of Mexico during 1920–1924
 Ignacio Comonfort,  President of Mexico in 1855.
 Juan O'Donojú, viceroy of New Spain
 Rómulo O'Farril, founder of newspaper Novedades
 Juan O'Gorman, architect
 Edmundo O'Gorman, writer
 Hugo Oconór, Spanish governor of Texas from 1767 to 1770
 Alejo Bay, governor of Sonora from 1923 to 1927
 Michael Wadding, Jesuit priest and missionary
 Judith Grace, television hostess
 Cristina Fink, retired high jumper of Spanish, Dutch, Irish, and German  descent
 Margo, Mexican actress and dancer of Irish descent
 Pablo O'Higgins, American-Mexican artist, muralist and illustrator of Irish descent
 Carlos Gallardo, Mexican actor, producer and occasional screenwriter and director to a Mexican father and an Irish mother
 Tomas O'Horan, Mexican lawyer, magistrate and senator of Irish descent
 Jon Riley, born in Ireland, served in Mexican Army during the Mexican-American War and founded Saint Patrick's Battalion.
 Justo Sierra O'Reilly, Mexican novelist and historian of Irish descent
 John Holloway, Irish-born Mexican lawyer, Marxist-oriented sociologist and philosopher currently living in Mexico
 Sara Ramirez, Mexican singer and actress (mother of Irish-American descent)
 Álvaro Obregón Tapia,  Mexican politician of Irish descent
 Dolores Creel Miranda, Mexican artist of Irish descent
 Daniel Chavez Moran, Mexican businessman of Irish descent
 Aarón Díaz Spencer, Mexican actor, singer, and model to Irish-American mother.
 Philip Crosthwaite, born in Ireland, was an early settler of San Diego, California and Rosarito, Baja California
 Luis Humberto Crosthwaite, Mexican writer of Irish-American descent
 Louis CK, American-born comedian and actor, mother was Irish American, father was Mexican/Hungarian. CK (Szekely) was partially raised in Mexico City.
 Santiago Creel, Mexican politician of Irish descent
 Grey Griffin, American-born actress of mixed Irish-Mexican descent
 Guillermo Sheridan, Mexican writer of Irish descent.
 Patricio O'Ward, Mexican Indy Car driver.
 Roberto Ransom, Mexican writer of Irish descent.
 Lynda Carter, American-born actress of Irish-Mexican descent.

See also

Alvarez Kelly, a Western film about an Irish Mexican in the American Civil War.
Saint Patrick's Battalion
 Ireland–Mexico relations

References

External links
 Murray, Edmundo  "The Irish in Latin America and Iberia: A Bibliography - Mexico and Hispanic North America"
 Murray, Edmundo  "The San Patricio Battalion: A Bibliography"
History of Mexico: The Irish Presence at the Houston Institute for Culture.
The legend of Zorro was an Irishman (William Lamport).
 The O'Brien clan in Mexico.
Primary and secondary sources relating to the Irish in Mexico (Sources database for Irish research)

European Mexican
Mexico
 
 
Immigration to Mexico
Ethnic groups in Mexico